Pat Kelly  (born 1971) is a Canadian politician, who was elected to represent the riding of Calgary Rocky Ridge in the House of Commons in the 2015 federal election defeating well known broadcast journalist Nirmala Naidoo.  A native Calgarian and graduate of Bowness High School and the University of Calgary, Kelly worked as a mortgage broker until his election in 2015.  Kelly currently serves as the Shadow Minister for National Revenue in the Conservative shadow cabinet.  He is married and has three daughters.

Electoral record

References

External links

Living people
Members of the House of Commons of Canada from Alberta
Politicians from Calgary
Conservative Party of Canada MPs
University of Calgary alumni
21st-century Canadian politicians
1971 births